Makimono (Japanese 巻物: "rolled thing") may refer to:

 Makimono, a horizontal type of Japanese handscroll/scroll
 Emakimono (lit. "picture scroll"), a horizontal picture scroll
 Makimono (sushi) (lit. "rolled sushi"), a type of sushi

See also
 Kakemono, a vertical Japanese scroll painting